Weightlifting was contested from September 23 to October 1, 1990, at the 1990 Asian Games in Ditan Gymnasium, Beijing, China.

Medalists

Men

Women

Medal table

References
 Weightlifting Database

 
1990 Asian Games events
1990
Asian Games
Asian Games
1990